Takaanini railway station, formerly spelt Takanini, is on the Southern Line of the Auckland railway network in New Zealand. The station has an island platform layout and is accessed from Manuroa Road, Station Road and Taka Street in the Takanini suburb of Auckland.

History 
The station, originally known as Lupton's Crossing, was opened in October 1913. Goods services were closed on 29 April 1980.

Proposed upgrade 
A proposal was made by the former Papakura District Council to create a new station and Park and Ride facility at Glenora Road, next to the new Southgate shopping centre, to coincide with the new Addison residential development taking place on the former horse training track land.

In 2012, the Papakura Local Board requested a new station and park and ride be built at Walters Road. This proposal was listed in Auckland Transport's draft land transport plan.

On 19 October 2018, Auckland Transport renamed the station to Takaanini in line with Auckland Council's Te Reo Māori policy to reflect the correct spelling of Ihaka Wirihana Takaanini after whom the area is named.

Services
Auckland One Rail, on behalf of Auckland Transport, operates suburban services to Britomart, Papakura and Pukekohe via Takaanini. Since 17 November 2019, the basic weekday off-peak timetable is:
3 tph to Britomart, via Penrose and Newmarket
3 tph to Papakura

Bus route 365 serves Takaanini Station and route 33 passes close by.

See also 
 List of Auckland railway stations

References 

Rail transport in Auckland
Railway stations in New Zealand
Buildings and structures in Auckland
Railway stations opened in 1913